Samuel Alan Stubbs (born 20 November 1998) is an English professional footballer who plays as a centre-back for Bradford City.

Club career
Stubbs joined Wigan Athletic in 2013, after progressing through the Everton youth ranks. On 8 August 2017, Stubbs made his Wigan debut during their EFL Cup tie against Blackpool, which resulted in a 2–1 victory for the Latics.

On 29 August 2017, Stubbs joined Crewe Alexandra on a six-month loan deal, and made his League debut at Exeter City on 16 September 2017. At the end of his loan spell in January 2018, Stubbs returned to Wigan, before joining AFC Fylde for a month-long loan.

He was released by Wigan at the end of the 2017–18 season, and subsequently joined Middlesbrough on 1 July 2018. On 31 January 2019, Stubbs joined League Two strugglers Notts County on loan until the end of the season.

In August 2019 he signed on loan for Scottish club Hamilton Academical. Middlesbrough ended the loan in January 2020, with the intention of sending Stubbs to Dutch club ADO Den Haag.

On 9 September 2020, Stubbs joined League One side Fleetwood Town on a two-year deal. He scored his first goal for Fleetwood in a 4-1 win against Hull City on 9 October 2020.

On 21 January 2021, Stubbs signed for League Two side Exeter City. He scored his first goals for City on March 26, 2022, a brace in a 2-1 win over Stevenage FC.

In January 2023 he signed for Bradford City.

Personal life
Stubbs is the son of former Bolton Wanderers, Celtic and Everton defender Alan Stubbs.

Career statistics

Honours
Exeter City
League Two runner-up: 2021–22

References

External links

1998 births
Living people
Footballers from Liverpool
English footballers
Association football defenders
Wigan Athletic F.C. players
Crewe Alexandra F.C. players
Middlesbrough F.C. players
Notts County F.C. players
English Football League players
Hamilton Academical F.C. players
Fleetwood Town F.C. players
Exeter City F.C. players
Scottish Professional Football League players
English expatriate footballers
English expatriate sportspeople in the Netherlands
AFC Fylde players
Bradford City A.F.C. players